Beat Boy is the third studio album by the British new wave band Visage. It was recorded at Trident Studios between 1982 and 1983 and released on Polydor Records in October 1984 (delayed by contractual problems the band were having at that time). Reaching No. 79 on the UK album chart, the album was poorly received by critics and would be the band's last studio album for almost thirty years.

Background 
The album was recorded and released after lead singer Steve Strange decided to make Visage a live band instead of being solely a studio-based project, a decision that left him working only with drummer Rusty Egan and a trio of newer musicians. Billy Currie (the Ultravox keyboardist who had been part of Visage for their first two albums) left the band soon after recording commenced, though co-wrote and played on the track "Only The Good Die Young". Keyboardist Dave Formula, who co-wrote two tracks, also departed the band during this time.

Beat Boy was released on 26 October 1984 on vinyl and cassette by Polydor Records. The cassette version of the album featured remixes of the album's original tracks, with a total running time of over 50 minutes. This included an extra track, the instrumental "Reprise" (a reprise of the track "Questions").

Beat Boy was eventually released on CD for the first time in February 2009 by Cherry Red Records, and featured the same track list as the original vinyl album with four extra tracks (see below). The remixed version of the album (as featured on the original cassette) was released by Rubellan Remasters on CD in 2022.

Reception 

Beat Boy was poorly received by critics. In a scathing review of the album, Ian Cranna of Smash Hits characterised Strange and Egan as "two wafer-thin talents" and described the album as "a cross between all-purpose Euro-disco and Queen, with excruciatingly amateurish lyrics".

Though the band's first two studio albums peaked within the Top 20 and Top 10 respectively, each earning a Silver disc in the UK, Beat Boy peaked at number 79 and spent only two weeks on the album chart. Two singles were released from the album, "Love Glove" in August 1984 (UK No. 54) and "Beat Boy" in November 1984, which did not chart. The critical and commercial failure of the album effectively marked the end of Visage as a recording act for the next couple of decades.

Track listing

Remixed cassette version

Personnel 

Visage

 Steve Strange – lead vocals
 Andy Barnett – guitar
 Steve Barnacle – bass
 Gary Barnacle – saxophone
 Rusty Egan – drums, electronic drum

 Additional personnel

 Billy Currie – keyboards
 Dave Formula – keyboards
 Marsha Raven – backing vocals
 Karen Ramsey – backing vocals
 Rose Patterson – backing vocals

References

External links 

 

Visage (band) albums
1984 albums
Polydor Records albums
Albums recorded at Trident Studios